Hanna Riikka Holopainen (born 8 October 1976 in Lappeenranta) is a Finnish Green League politician currently serving in the Parliament of Finland for the electoral district of South-Eastern Finland.

References

1976 births
Living people
People from Lappeenranta
Green League politicians
Members of the Parliament of Finland (2019–23)
21st-century Finnish women politicians
Women members of the Parliament of Finland
Lappeenranta University of Technology alumni